Chuck Puleo (born 20 September 1972 from Mesa, Arizona) is an American professional darts player who currently plays in the Professional Darts Corporation events.

He qualified for the 2019 PDC World Darts Championship as the highest-ranked American finisher in the 2018 CDC Pro Tour. He was drawn to play against the twice World Youth Champion Dimitri Van den Bergh of Belgium, and despite neither player playing anywhere near top form, Van den Bergh won the match 3–0.

On 8 May 2019, it was revealed that Puleo would partner up alongside "Big Daddy" Darin Young at the prestigious PDC World Cup of Darts in June, held in Hamburg, Germany.

World Championship Results

PDC
 2019: First round: (lost to Dimitri Van den Bergh 0–3)

References

External links

1972 births
Living people
American darts players
PDC World Cup of Darts American team